The 2023 Argentine Torneo Federal A, was the eleventh season of the Torneo Federal A, the regionalised third tier of the Argentine football league system. The tournament is reserved for teams indirectly affiliated to the Asociación del Fútbol Argentino (AFA), while teams affiliated to AFA have to play the Primera B Metropolitana, which is the other third tier competition. The competition was contested by 29 of the 34 teams that took part in the 2021 season, with one team relegated from Primera Nacional and six teams promoted from Torneo Regional Federal Amateur. One team is be promoted to Primera Nacional, other teams qualify for a promotion playoff against a team from Primera B Metropolitana and four teams were relegated to Torneo Regional Federal Amateur. The season began on 12 march and ended on 26 November 2023.

Format

First stage
The 36 teams were split into four zones of nine teams, where they will play against the other teams in their group four: twice at home and twice away. The top four teams from each zone qualified for the final stages.

Final Stages
The final stages was played between the 16 teams that qualified from the first stage. They were seeded in the final stages according to their results in the first stage, with the best eight seeded 1–8, and the worst eight teams seeded 9–16. The teams played four rounds and the winner was declared champion and automatically promoted to the Primera Nacional, the losing team in the final qualified for a promotion playoff against a team from Primera B Metropolitana.

Relegation
After the first stage, the bottom team of each zone were relegated to the Torneo Regional Federal Amateur, giving a total of four teams relegated.

Club information

Zone A

Zone B

Zone C

Zone D

First stage

Zone A

Results

Matches 1–18

Matches 19–36

Zone B

Results

Matches 1–18

Matches 19–36

Zone C

Results

Matches 1–18

Matches 19–36

Zone D

Results

Matches 1–18

Matches 19–36

See also
 2023 Copa de la Liga Profesional
 2023 Argentine Primera División
 2023 Primera Nacional
 2023 Primera B Metropolitana
 2023 Copa Argentina

References

External links
 Sitio Oficial de AFA   
 Ascenso del Interior  
 Interior Futbolero 
 Solo Ascenso  
 Mundo Ascenso  
 Promiedos  

Torneo Federal A seasons